Notes:
 DSC is an abbreviation for Digital Still Camera
 Models without a “V” suffix do not include built-in GPS functionality

D series

F series

G series

H series 

All cameras used CCD sensors and had optical image stabilization. The series included bridge cameras and compact cameras.

HX series

Note: HX is an abbreviation for HyperXoom

All cameras used CMOS sensors, could zoom optically while filming, and had optical image stabilization. The series included bridge cameras and Compact cameras with Superzoom.

L series 
 DSC-L1 (2004, 4.0 megapixels, 3x optical zoom)

M series 
Compact cameras with a unique vertical-grip design and an articulated screen
 DSC-M1 (2004, 5.0 megapixels, 3x optical zoom)
 DSC-M2 (2005, 5.0 megapixels, 3x optical zoom)

MD series 
Compact camera using MiniDiscs.

N series 

 DSC-N1 (2005, 3" LCD touch screen, 8.1 megapixels, 3x optical zoom)
 DSC-N2 (2006, 3" LCD touch screen, 10.1 megapixels, 3x optical zoom)

P series 

Ultra-compact cameras with distinctive rounded edge on one side
 DSC-P1 (2000, 1.5" LCD, 3 megapixels, 3x optical zoom)
 DSC-P2 (1.9 megapixels, 3x optical zoom)
 DSC-P3 (2.8 megapixels)
 DSC-P5 (1.5" LCD, 3.1 megapixels, 3x optical zoom)
 DSC-P7 (1.5" LCD, 3.1 megapixels, 3x optical zoom)
 DSC-P8 (2003, 1.5" LCD, 3.1 megapixels, 3x optical zoom)
 DSC-P9 (2002, 1.5" LCD, 4.0 megapixels, 3x optical zoom)
 DSC-P10 (2003, 1.5" LCD, 5.0 megapixels, 3x optical zoom)
 DSC-P12 (Same as DSC-P10, packaged with more accessories)
 DSC-P20 (2001–2002, 1.1 megapixels, 3x digital zoom)
 DSC-P30 (2002–2003, 1.2 megapixels)
 DSC-P31 (2002–2003, 2 megapixels, 3x digital zoom)
 DSC-P32 (2003, 3.2 megapixels, 1.6x digital zoom)
 DSC-P41 (2004, 4.1 megapixels, fixed lens)
 DSC-P43 (2004, 4.1 megapixels, fixed lens)
 DSC-P50 (2001, 2.1 megapixels, 3x optical zoom)
 DSC-P51 (2002, 2.1 megapixels, 2x optical zoom)
 DSC-P52 (2003, 3.2 megapixels, 2x optical zoom)
 DSC-P71 (2002, 3.2 megapixels, 3x optical zoom)
 DSC-P72 (2003, 3.2 megapixels, 3x optical zoom)
 DSC-P73 (2004, 4.1 megapixels, 3x optical zoom)
 DSC-P92 (2003, 5 megapixels, 3x optical zoom)
 DSC-P93 (2004, 5.0 megapixels, 3x optical zoom)
 DSC-P100 (2004, 5.1 megapixels, 3x optical zoom)
 DSC-P120 (special edition version of DSC-P100)
 DSC-P150 (2004, 7.2 megapixels, 3x optical zoom)
 DSC-P200 (2005, 7.2 megapixels, 3x optical zoom)

QX series 
Lens-style compact cameras designed exclusively for use with smartphones.
 DSC-QX10 (2013, 18.2 megapixels, 1/2.3 inch (7.76 mm) Exmor R™ CMOS sensor, 10x optical zoom, f/3.3–5.9 Sony G Lens)
 DSC-QX30 (2014, 20.4 megapixels, 1/2.3 inch (7.82 mm) Exmor R™ CMOS sensor, 30x optical zoom, ƒ/3.5–6.3 Sony G Lens)
 DSC-QX100 (2014, 20.2 megapixels, 1-inch (13.2x8.8 mm) Exmor R™ CMOS sensor, 3.6x optical zoom, f/1.8–4.9 Carl ZEISS® Vario-Sonnar T* lens)
 ILCE-QX1 (2014, 20.1 megapixels, APS-C (23.2x15.4 mm) CMOS sensor, interchangeable E-mount lens)

R series 

Bridge camera with large sensor
 DSC-R1 (2005–2006, 10.3-megapixel APS-C. 5x 24–120 mm equivalent optical zoom, first Cyber-shot to use CMOS)

RX series

 RX100 series – compact cameras with 1.0" type 20.2-megapixel sensors
 DSC-RX100 (2012, Exmor CMOS sensor with 28-100mm f1.8–4.9 Carl Zeiss Vario-Sonnar T* lens)
 DSC-RX100 II (2013, Exmor R CMOS sensor with 28-100mm f1.8–4.9 Carl Zeiss Vario-Sonnar T* lens)
 DSC-RX100 III (2014, Exmor R CMOS sensor with 24-70mm f1.8-2.8 Carl Zeiss Vario-Sonnar T* lens)
 DSC-RX100 IV (2015, Exmor RS CMOS sensor with 24-70mm f1.8-2.8 Carl Zeiss Vario-Sonnar T* lens)
 DSC-RX100 V (2016, Exmor RS CMOS sensor with 24-70mm f1.8-2.8 Carl Zeiss Vario-Sonnar T* lens)
 DSC-RX100 VI (2018, Exmor RS CMOS sensor with 24-200mm f2.8-4.5 Carl Zeiss Vario-Sonnar T* lens)
 DSC-RX100 VII (2019, Exmor RS CMOS sensor with 24-200mm f2.8-4.5 Carl Zeiss Vario-Sonnar T* lens)
 RX10 series – bridge cameras with 1.0" sensors
 DSC-RX10 (2013, 1.0" type 20-megapixel BSI-CMOS sensor with fixed zoom lens Carl Zeiss Sonnar T* 24–200mm (equivalent 35mm) F2.8 along the zoom range), BIONZ X processor as Sony α7, has 3 EV built-in ND filter, 10fps, Wi-Fi, and NFC. Capable for high video quality shoot with stepless aperture control, headphone and mic sockets, focus peaking, zebra exposure warning, and uncompressed video output.
 DSC-RX10 II (2015, 20-megapixel BSI-CMOS sensor, BIONZ X processor)
 DSC-RX10 III (2016)
 DSC-RX10 IV (2017)
 RX1 series – compact full-frame cameras with a fixed 35mm 2.0 Carl Zeiss Sonnar T* lenses
 DSC-RX1 / DSC-RX1R (2012, 24-megapixel Exmor CMOS sensor)
 DSC-RX1R II (2015, 42.4-megapixel Exmor R CMOS sensor)

S series 

The DSC-S85 (released in 2001), was the first 4-megapixel consumer-level digital camera.
 DSC-S30 (2000, 1.3 megapixels, 3x optical zoom)
 DSC-S40 (2005, 4.0 megapixels, 3x optical zoom)
 DSC-S45
 DSC-S50 (2000, 2.1 megapixels, 3x optical zoom)
 DSC-S60 (2005, 2" LCD, 4.0 megapixels)
 DSC-S70 (2000, 3.3 megapixels)
 DSC-S75 (2001, 3.3 megapixels)
 DSC-S80 (2005, 4.1 megapixels, 3x optical zoom)
 DSC-S85 (2001, 4.1 megapixels, 3x optical zoom)
 DSC-S90 (2005, 4.1 megapixels, 3x optical zoom)
 DSC-S500 (6.0 megapixels. 3x optical zoom)
 DSC-S600 (2006, 6.0 megapixels. 3x optical zoom)
 DSC-S650 (2007, 7.2 megapixels, 3x optical zoom)
 DSC-S700 (2007, 7.2 megapixels, 3x optical zoom)
 DSC-S730 (2008, 7.2 megapixels. 3x optical zoom)
 DSC-S750 (2008, 7.2 megapixels. 3x optical zoom)
 DSC-S780 (2008, 8.1 megapixels. 3x optical zoom)
 DSC-S800 (2007, 8.1 megapixels. 6x optical zoom)
 DSC-S930 (2009, 10.1 megapixels. 3x optical zoom)
 DSC-S950 (2009, 10.1 megapixels. 4x optical zoom)
 DSC-S980 (2009, 12.1 megapixels. 4x optical zoom)
 DSC-S2000 (2010, 10.1 megapixels. 3x optical zoom)
 DSC-S2100 (2010, 12.1 megapixels. 3x optical zoom)
 DSC-S3000 (2011, 10.1 megapixels, 3x optical zoom)

T series 
Ultra-thin compact cameras

 DSC-T1 (Jan 2004, 5.1 megapixels. 3x optical zoom)
 DSC-T1C (2004, 7.2 megapixels. 3x optical zoom)
 DSC-T2 (Dec 2007, 2.7" LCD touch screen, 8.1 megapixels. 3x optical zoom, 4 GB internal storage)
 DSC-T3 (2004, 2.5" LCD, 5.1 megapixels, 3x optical zoom)
 DSC-T5 (Sep 2005, 2.5" LCD, 5 megapixels, 3x optical zoom)

 DSC-T7 (May 2005, 2.5" LCD, 5.1 megapixels, 3x optical zoom)
 DSC-T9 (Jan 2006, 2.5" LCD, 6 megapixels, 3x optical zoom)
  (Aug 2006, 2.5" LCD, 7.2 megapixels, 3x optical zoom)
 DSC-T11 (2004, 5.0 megapixels, 3x optical zoom)
 DSC-T20 (Apr 2007, 8.0 megapixels, 3x optical zoom)
 DSC-T30 (May 2006, 3" LCD, 7.2 megapixels, 3x optical zoom)
 DSC-T33 (Mar 2005, 5.1 megapixels, 3x optical zoom)
 DSC-T50 (Oct 2006, 3.0" LCD touch screen, 7.2 megapixels. 3x optical zoom)
 DSC-T70 (Sep 2007, 3.0-inch LCD touch screen, 8.1 megapixels, 3x optical zoom)
 DSC-T75 (2007, 3.0-inch LCD touch screen, 8.1 megapixels, 3x optical zoom)
 DSC-T77 (Sep 2008, 3.0-inch LCD touch screen, 10.1 megapixels, 4x optical zoom)
 DSC-T90 (Mar 2009, 3.0-inch LCD touch screen, 12.1 megapixels, 4x optical zoom, 720p HD Movies)
 DSC-T99 (Aug 2010, 3.0-inch touch screen 14.1 megapixels, 720p HD Movies, Sweep Panorama, 4x optical zoom, personalisation)
 DSC-T100 (Mar 2007, 3.0-inch LCD, 8.0 megapixels. 5x optical zoom)
 DSC-T110 (Mar 2011, 3.0-inch touch screen, 16.2 megapixels, 720p HD movie, Intelligent Sweep Panorama, 4x optical zoom)
 DSC-T200 (Sep 2007, 3.5-inch touch screen LCD, 8.1 megapixels, 5x optical zoom)
 DSC-T300 (Mar 2008, 3.5-inch touch screen LCD, 10.1 megapixels, 5x optical zoom)
 DSC-T500 (Oct 2008, 3.5-inch touch screen LCD, 10.1 megapixels, 5x optical zoom, 720p HD Movies)
 DSC-T700 (Sep 2008, 3.5-inch touch screen LCD, 4 GB internal memory, 10.1 megapixels, 4x optical zoom)
 DSC-T900 (Mar 2009, 3.5-inch touch screen LCD, 12.1 megapixels, 4x optical zoom, 720p HD Movies)
 DSC-TF1 (Jan 2013, 2.7-inch LCD (not touch-screen), 16.1 megapixels)
 DSC-TX1 (Sep 2009, 3.0-inch touch screen, 10.2 megapixels, 720p HD Movies, Sweep Panorama, 4x optical zoom, personalisation)
 DSC-TX5 (Mar 2010, 3.0-inch touch screen, 10.2 megapixels, 720p HD Movies, Sweep Panorama, 4x optical zoom, personalisation, waterproof, dustproof, shockproof, freeze-proof)
 DSC-TX7 (Jan 2010, 3.5-inch touch screen, 10.2 megapixels, 1080i Full HD Movies, Sweep Panorama, 4x optical zoom, personalisation)
 DSC-TX9 (Aug 2010, 3.5-inch touch screen, 12.2 megapixels, 1080i Full HD Movies, 3D Sweep Panorama, 4x optical zoom, personalisation)
 DSC-TX10 (Mar 2011, 3.0-inch touch screen, 16.2 megapixels, Full HD 1080i movie, 3D Sweep Panorama, 3D stills, 4x optical zoom, personalisation, waterproof, dustproof, shockproof, freeze-proof)
 DSC-TX20 (May 2012, 3.0-inch touch screen, 16.2 megapixel Exmor R CMOS, 4x optical zoom, full HD 1080p, waterproof, shockproof)
 DSC-TX30 (Mar 2013, 3.3-inch OLED touch screen, 18.2-megapixel, 5x optical zoom, waterproof, shockproof, freezeproof, dustproof)
 DSC-TX55 (Sep 2011, 3.3-inch OLED, 16.2-megapixel Exmor R CMOS, 5x optical zoom, 10x Clear Image zoom / 26 mm wide angle, AVCHD Full HD, OLED, Sweep Panorama)
 DSC-TX66 (Mar 2012, 3.3-inch OLED touch screen, 18.2 megapixels, Exmor R CMOS sensor, slim as an AA battery, Full HD 1080/60i video, high speed AF, 5x optical zoom, 10x Clear Image zoom, up to 10fps)
 DSC-TX100V (Mar 2011，3.5-inch touch screen, 16.2-megapixel CMOS sensor, 4x optical zoom, Full HD 1080i movie, 3D Sweep Panorama, 3D stills, transfer jet technology, HDMI output, GPS, Compass)
 DSC-TX200V (Mar 2012, 3.3-inch OLED touch screen, 18.2 megapixels, Full HD 1080p60 movie)
 DSC-TX300V (Mar 2012, 3.3-inch OLED touch screen, 18.2 megapixels, Japan release only)

U series 

Sub-miniature cameras using 2xAAA batteries
 DSC-U10 (Jul 2002, 1.3 megapixels)
 DSC-U20 (Dec 2002, 2.0 megapixels)
 DSC-U30 (Jun 2003, 2.0 megapixels)
 DSC-U40 (Nov 2003)
 DSC-U50 (Sep 2003, 2.0 megapixels)
 DSC-U60 (Jun 2003, 2.0 megapixels, waterproof)

V series 

'Prosumer' level Bridge cameras
 DSC-V1 (2003, 1.5" LCD, 5.0 megapixels, 4x optical zoom)
 DSC-V3 (2004, 2.5" LCD, 7.1 megapixels, 4x optical zoom)

W series 

Cameras using a CCD Sensor and wide angle lens with a special coating.

With point-and-shoot camera sales decreasing, Sony has not made a new model since 2014 and is likely to discontinue the lineup.
 DSC-W1 (2004, 5.1 megapixels, Manual mode, 3x optical zoom)
 DSC-W5/W15 (2005, 5.1 megapixels, Manual mode, 3x optical zoom)
 DSC-W7/W17 (2005, 7.1 megapixels, Manual mode, 3x optical zoom)
 DSC-W12 (2004, 5.1 megapixels, Manual mode, 3x optical zoom)
 DSC-W30 (2006, 6.0 megapixels, no Manual mode, 3x optical zoom)
 DSC-W35 (2007, 7.2 megapixels, no Manual mode, 3x optical zoom)
 DSC-W40 (2006, 6.0 megapixels, no Manual mode, 3x optical zoom)
 DSC-W50 (2006, 6.0 megapixels, no Manual mode, 3x optical zoom)
 DSC-W55 (2007, 7.2 megapixels, no Manual mode, 3x optical zoom)
 DSC-W70 (2006, 7.2 megapixels, no Manual mode, 3x optical zoom)
 DSC-W80 (2007, 7.2 megapixels, no Manual mode, 3x optical zoom, HDTV output)
 DSC-W90 (2007, 8.1 megapixels, 3x optical zoom)
 DSC-W100 (2006, 8.1 megapixels, Manual Mode, 3x optical zoom)
 DSC-W110 (2008, 7.2 megapixels, no Manual mode, 4x optical zoom)
 DSC-W115 (2008, 7.2 megapixels, no Manual mode, 4x optical zoom)
 DSC-W120 (2008, 7.2 megapixels, no Manual mode, 4x optical zoom)
 DSC-W130 (2008, 8.1 megapixels, no Manual mode, 4x optical zoom)
 DSC-W150 (2008, 8.1 megapixels, no Manual mode, 5x optical zoom)
 DSC-W170 (2008, 10.1 megapixels, no Manual mode, 5x optical zoom)
 DSC-W180 (2009, 10.1 megapixels, 3x optical zoom)
 DSC-W190 (2009, 12.1 megapixels, 3x optical zoom)
 DSC-W200 (2007, 12.1 megapixels, Manual Mode, 3x optical zoom)
 DSC-W210 (2009, 12.1 megapixels, no Manual mode, 4x optical zoom)
 DSC-W215 (2007, 12.1 megapixels, no Manual mode, 4x optical zoom)
 DSC-W220 (2009, 12.1 megapixels, no Manual mode, 4x optical zoom)
 DSC-W230 (2009, 12.1 megapixels, no Manual mode, 4x optical zoom)
 DSC-W270 (2009, 12.1 megapixels, no Manual mode, 5x optical zoom, HD Movie 720p)
 DSC-W290 (2009, 12.1 megapixels, no Manual mode, 5x optical zoom, HD Movie 720p)
 DSC-W300 (2008, 13.6 megapixels, Manual Mode, 3x optical zoom, 2.7" LCD)
 DSC-W310 (2010, 12.1 megapixels, 4x optical zoom, 2.7˝ LCD)
 DSC-W320 (2010, 14.1 megapixels, 4x optical zoom, 2.7˝ LCD)
 DSC-W330 (2010, 14.1 megapixels, 4x optical zoom, Full VGA Movie, 3.0˝ LCD)
 DSC-W350 (2010, 14.1 megapixels, 4x optical zoom, HD Movie 720p, 2.7˝ LCD)
 DSC-W360 (2010, 14.1 megapixels, 4x optical zoom, HD Movie 720p, 3.0˝ LCD)
 DSC-W370 (2010, 14.1 megapixels, 7x optical zoom, HD Movie 720p, 3.0˝ LCD)
 DSC-W380 (2010, 14.1 megapixels, 5x optical zoom, HD Movie 720p, 2.7˝ LCD)
 DSC-W390 (2010, 14.1 megapixels, 5x optical zoom, HD Movie 720p, 3.0˝ LCD)
 DSC-W510 (2011, 12.1 megapixels, 4x optical zoom, 2.7" LCD)
 DSC-W520 (2011, 14.1 megapixels, 5x optical zoom, 2.7" LCD)
 DSC-W530 (2011, 14.1 megapixels, 4x optical zoom, 2.7" LCD)
 DSC-W550 (2011, 14.1 megapixels, 4x optical zoom, 3.0" LCD)
 DSC-W560 (2011, 14.1 megapixels, 4x optical zoom, HD Movie 720p, 3.0" LCD)
 DSC-W570 (2011, 16.1 megapixels, 5x optical zoom, HD Movie 720p, 2.7" LCD)
 DSC-W580 (2011, 16.1 megapixels, 5x optical zoom, HD Movie 720p, 3.0" LCD)
 DSC-W610 (2012, 14.1 megapixels, 4x optical zoom, 2.6" LCD)
 DSC-W620 (2012, 14.1 megapixels, 5x optical zoom, HD Movie 720p, 2.6" LCD)
 DSC-W630 (2012, 16.1 megapixels, 5x optical zoom, HD Movie 720p, 2.6" LCD)
 DSC-W650 (2012, 16.1 megapixels, 5x optical zoom, HD Movie 720p, 3.0" LCD)
 DSC-W670 (2012, 16.1 megapixels, 6x optical zoom, HD Movie 720p, 2.6" LCD)
 DSC-W690 (2012, 16.1 megapixels, 10x optical zoom, HD Movie 720p, 3.0" LCD)
 DSC-W710 (2013, 16.1 megapixels, 5x optical zoom, HD Movie 720p, 2.7" LCD)
 DSC-W730 (2013, 16.1 megapixels, 8x optical zoom, HD Movie 720p, 2.7" LCD)
DSC-W800 (2014, 20.1 megapixels, 5x optical zoom, HD Movie 720p, 2.7" LCD)
DSC-W810 (2014, 20.1 megapixels, 6x optical zoom, HD Movie 720p, 2.7" LCD)
DSC-W830 (2014, 20.1 megapixels, 8x optical zoom, HD Movie 720p, 2.7" LCD)

WX Series 
Cameras using a CMOS Sensor, designed for faster auto-focus and low light capability. All cameras have optical image stabilization and can zoom optically while filming.
 DSC-WX1 (2009, 10.2 megapixels, no Manual mode, 5x optical zoom, G Lens, Sweep Panorama, HD Movie 720p)
 DSC-WX5 (2010, 12.2 megapixels, 5x optical zoom, G Lens, 3D Sweep Panorama, HD Movie 1080i, 2.8˝ LCD)
 DSC-WX7 (2011, 16.2 megapixels, 5x zoom, 3D Sweep Panorama, Full HD Movie 1080/60i 2.3˝ LCD)
 DSC-WX9 (2011, 16.2 megapixels, 5x optical zoom, 3D Sweep Panorama, Full HD 1080/60i video, 3.0˝ LCD)
 DSC-WX10 (2011, 16.2 megapixels, 7x optical zoom, G Lens, 3D Sweep Panorama, HD Movie 1080i, 2.8˝ LCD)
 DSC-WX30 (2011, 16.2 megapixels, 5x optical zoom, 3D Sweep Panorama, HD Movie 1080p, 3.0˝ LCD)
 DSC-WX50 (2012, 16.2 megapixels, 5x optical zoom, 3D Sweep Panorama, HD Movie 1080p, 2.6˝ LCD)
 DSC-WX60 (2013, 16.2 megapixels, 8x optical zoom, Zeiss Lens, 3D Sweep Panorama, HD Movie 1080i, 2.7˝ LCD)
 DSC-WX70 (2012, 16.2 megapixels, 5x optical zoom, 3D Sweep Panorama, HD Movie 1080p, 3.0˝ LCD)
 DSC-WX80 (2013, Wi-Fi, 16.2 megapixels, 8x optical zoom, Zeiss Lens, 3D Sweep Panorama, HD Movie 1080i, 2.7˝ LCD)
 DSC-WX100 (2012, 18.2 megapixels, 10x optical zoom, G Lens, 3D Sweep Panorama, HD Movie 1080i, 2.7˝ LCD)
 DSC-WX150 (2012, 18.2 megapixels, 10x optical zoom, G Lens, 3D Sweep Panorama, HD Movie 1080i, 3.0˝ LCD)
 DSC-WX170 (2012, 18.2 megapixels, 10x optical zoom, G Lens, 3D Sweep Panorama, HD Movie 1080i, 3.0˝ LCD)
 DSC-WX200 (2013, Wi-Fi, 18.2 megapixels, 10x optical zoom, G Lens, 3D Sweep Panorama, HD Movie 1080i, 3.0˝ LCD)
 DSC-WX220 (2014, Wi-Fi, NFC, 18.2 megapixels, 10x optical zoom, G Lens, Exmor R CMOS Sensor, HD Movie 1080i with AVCHD, available to connect to 4K TV, 2.7˝ LCD)
 DSC-WX300 (2013, Wi-Fi, 18.2 megapixels, 20x optical zoom, G Lens, 3D Sweep Panorama, HD Movie 1080i, 3.0˝ LCD)
 DSC-WX350 (2014, Wi-Fi, NFC, Remote control with smartphone, 18.2 megapixels, 20x optical zoom, G Lens, Exmor R CMOS Sensor, HD Movie 1080i with AVCHD, available to connect to 4K TV, 3.0˝ LCD)
 DSC-WX500 (2015, 18.2 Megapixels, 30x optical zoom, 180° Tilt LCD)
 DSC-WX800 (2018, 20 Megapixels, 30x optical zoom, 180° Tilt LCD, 4K video, Eye-AF)

3D cameras
On July 7, 2010, Sony unveiled the Sony DSC-TX9 and DSC-WX5, which were the world's smallest 3D cameras and capture 3D images with a single lens system using a sweeping motion. Sony also introduced the DSC-T99 14.1MP CCD camera for about $250. The three cameras above offered a 3D Sweep Panorama feature, which let one take panoramic pictures in a single press-and-sweep motion. The high-speed burst of frames is digitally stitched together to automatically create a detail-packed 3D panorama. These images can be viewed in 2D or 3D on compatible 3D televisions.

Sony Ericsson mobile phones 

In 2006, the now-defunct Sony Mobile (then known as Sony Ericsson Mobile Communications, a joint venture between Sony and Ericsson) launched a mobile phone using the Cyber-shot branding for the Sony Ericsson K800i, featuring a 3.2-megapixel Cyber-shot digital camera and a xenon flash.

On February 6, 2007, Sony Ericsson announced the K810 Cyber-shot phone. Building on the success of the K800, the K810 added a number of features that made its 3.2-megapixel autofocus camera even more camera-like. Sony Ericsson also expanded its Cyber-shot branding to a mid-range handset, the K550, which had a 2.0-megapixel camera bundled with autofocus and LED flash.

Sony Ericsson announced its flagship K850 on June 14, 2007, and its Candy-bar K770 on February 3, 2008.

In Japan, Sony Ericsson used the Cyber-shot name on the SO905iCS, 'CS' standing for Cyber-shot. The handset featured an Exmor CMOS sensor, as well as a smile shutter, BRAVIA Screen and a 3x optical zoom mechanism.

As a successor to the popular K Series, Sony Ericsson introduced the 'C' Series. The initial handset released under this category was the 5-megapixel C902, with the C905 announced shortly thereafter. The C905 signalled Sony Ericsson's entry into the 8-megapixel camera phone market.

All Cyber-shot phones featured the following:

(Features marked with an asterisk (*) are not included with every model, but belong to high-end releases)

A camera look-alike overall design
Digital zoom
Auto focus
Flash (xenon or LED) with red-eye reduction
Image stabiliser*
Photo Fix (for a quick correction of photos)
PhotoDJ (for enhancing photos)
BestPic (Sony Ericsson's brand name for burst mode)*
Photo blogging
Video player
Video recording
Video stabilizer*
Video streaming*
After Sony's mobile division ceased to be a joint venture in 2012, all production of new Cyber-shot phones have currently stopped.

References

External links 

Best Bridge Camera
Sony DSC W830

 
Sony Cyber-shot cameras